Amphiaspis argo is the type species of the cyathaspidid taxon Amphiaspidida, and of the family Amphiaspididae. Its fossils are restricted to early Emsian-aged marine strata of the Taimyr Peninsula, Early Devonian Siberia.  A. argo, as with all other amphiaspidids, is thought to have been a benthic filter feeder that lived on top of, or buried just below the surface of the substrate of hypersaline lagoon-bottoms.

Anatomy
So far, A. argos is known from at least one, incomplete cephalothoracic armor that is shaped vaguely like a pillow and is, from anterior to posterior, 24 centimeters long.  The armor has a pattern of lateral sensory line canals.  There is a prominent dorsal spine on the dorsoposterior end of the cephalothoracic armor.  The animal had small, possibly degenerate eyes that were flanked laterally by a small, crescent-shaped preorbital opening at the anterior end of the armor.  The small eyes, in turn, laterally flank a small, slit-shaped mouth at the center of the anterior-most end of the cephalothorax.

References

Cyathaspidiformes genera
Amphiaspidida
Devonian jawless fish
Early Devonian fish
Heterostraci genera
Fauna of Siberia
Fossils of Russia
Early Devonian first appearances
Devonian extinctions